This is a list of members of the Tasmanian Legislative Council between 1879 and 1885. Terms of the Legislative Council did not coincide with Legislative Assembly elections, and members served six year terms, with a number of members facing election each year.

Elections

Members

Notes

  On 8 February 1879, William Grubb, one of the two members for Tamar, died. Frederick Grubb won the resulting by-election on 6 March 1879.
  On 29 February 1880, James Milne Wilson, one of the three members for Hobart, died. Alexander McGregor won the resulting by-election on 22 March 1880.
  In October 1880, one of the two Tamar seats, held by Frederick Grubb, was declared vacant owing to his extended absence from the chamber. John Scott won the resulting by-election on 30 November 1880.
  On 23 June 1880, Joseph Solomon was elected as the member for Huon. However, the election was ruled invalid, and a by-election was held on 5 November 1880. Solomon won the election but was disqualified, and William Fisher, the only other contestant, was deemed to have been elected at the poll. He died on 3 April 1882 and John Watchorn won the resulting by-election on 29 April 1882.
  On 12 January 1881, Thomas Field, the member for Meander, died. Frederick Grubb won the resulting by-election on 12 February 1881.
  On 2 March 1880, James Agnew, one of the three members for Hobart, resigned. Thomas Smart was elected unopposed on 8 March 1881.
  On 22 May 1881, James Lord, the member for Pembroke died. William Hodgson won the resulting by-election on 2 July 1881.
  On 11 May 1882, Frederick Innes, the member for South Esk, died. Charles Leake won the resulting by-election on 30 June 1882.
  On 22 January 1884, James MacLanachan, the member for Jordan, died. James Agnew won the resulting by-election on 18 February 1884.
  On 17 February 1884, Sir Thomas Chapman, the member for Buckingham, died. Sir Philip Fysh won the resulting by-election on 15 March 1884.
  In July 1884, Charles Leake, the member for South Esk, resigned. Sir Adye Douglas won the resulting by-election on 21 August 1884.

Sources
 Parliament of Tasmania (2006). The Parliament of Tasmania from 1856

Members of Tasmanian parliaments by term
19th-century Australian politicians